Kuchh Is Tara is an Indian television series that aired on Sony TV from November 2007 to August 2008.

Plot

Kanya Godbole, who hails from a middle-class family, tries to help her hotel employer by pretending to be her daughter and sign a contract on their behalf for a merger. But she falls in love with a wealthy young man named Ayan Nanda. She doesn't disclose her status to him out of fear that he wouldn't want to pursue a relationship with her. She later decides to tell him the truth in a letter, but it never reaches him. The truth comes out shortly before their engagement, and Ayan's mother forces him to end things with Kanya. During her brief relationship with Ayan, Kanya meets his young cynical uncle Ranbir. The two of them get off to a bad start and bicker constantly.

Ranbir has detested the concept of love all his life. Tired of his constant refusal to marry, his mother gives him an ultimatum - unless he finds a wife within the next three days, she will disinherit him. He is advised to marry Kanya; though he and Kanya are outraged at this, they agree nevertheless. He wants to save his wealth, and she wants to uphold her family's reputation as people had been accusing her of seducing Ayan for money. Many amusing moments follow Ranbir and Kanya's wedding. When they are alone, they spend all their time mocking each other.

Soon, it is revealed that Kanya suffers from multiple personality disorder. Her alter ego is called Natasha, a die-hard feminist who strives for justice for oppressed and abused women. Whenever Kanya sees flames or fire anywhere, she turns into Natasha. Ranbir is determined to find out who she really is, so he writes Natasha a letter claiming that a man named Ranbir Nanda is mistreating his wife. This way, he believes she would pursue him and he'd be able to see her face. Sure enough, Natasha makes him her next target.

Meanwhile, Ranbir and Kanya slowly begin to fall in love. They finally proclaim their love for each other. One night, Ranbir finally discovers that Kanya is Natasha. However, he assures Kanya's worried parents that he wants to spend the rest of his life with her no matter what. Ranbir and Kanya have a lavish wedding and renew their vows. Ranbir invites a London-based psychiatrist named Akshay to treat Kanya. However, Akshay has other plans and wants Ranbir and Kanya to split up. Akshay hints that Natasha isn't Kanya's alter ego—but the other way around. Kanya was adopted by her parents; before that, she supposedly lived in London as Natasha and was in a relationship with him.

Akshay elopes with Natasha, leaving Ranbir devastated. Just as everyone is lamenting losing Kanya, she shows up in front of them. Shanta Tai smugly explains that she went to London and met one of Akshay's colleagues, who told her everything about Akshay's past with Natasha. Shanta Tai managed to stop Akshay and Natasha on their way to the airport by attacking Akshay and bringing Kanya back. A psychiatrist states that Kanya's condition is treatable but will take time. The show ends with Ranbir and Kanya's reunion.

Cast 
 Dimple Jhangiani as Kanya/ Natasha (her split personality)
 Akashdeep Saigal as Ranbir Nanda
 Vishal Singh as Ayan Nanda 
 Jatin Shah as Dr. Akshay Tripathi
 Pragati Mehra as Avantika Nanda 
 Sudha Chandran / Anju Mahendru as Mallika Nanda 
 Rajendra Gupta as Anand Godbole 
 Jayati Bhatia as Pammi Godbole 
 Tarana Raja as Pooja Godbole 
 Usha Nadkarni as Shanta Tai 
 Sooraj Thapar as Aditya Nanda 
 Papiya Sengupta as Aastha Nanda 
 Shivangi Tomar as Reva Nanda 
  Aaditya Kapoor  as Siddharth Nanda 
 Vinny Arora as Simran 
 Praneeta Sahu as Shanaya Nanda 
 Madhuri Bhatia as Devika Kher 
 Amit Jain as Chinmay Godbole
 Anmol Singh as Archita Nanda 
 Aamir Ali as Guru
 Anuj Saxena as Abhay Kapoor (Episodic role - 51)
 Nausheen Ali Sardar as Kusum Abhay Kapoor (Episodic role - 51)

References

External links
 Official Site
 Official Site on Sony TV

Balaji Telefilms television series
Sony Entertainment Television original programming
Indian television series
2007 Indian television series debuts
Indian television soap operas
Television shows set in Mumbai
2008 Indian television series endings